John Taylor Caldwell (14 July 1911 – 12 January 2007) was a Glasgow-born anarchist communist and close associate and biographer of Guy Aldred. He wrote two volumes of autobiography which recount his early life growing up in Belfast, his early career as a mariner and his political development, as well as his close involvement with Aldred and the United Socialist Movement.

A career agitator
Caldwell joined Aldred's United Socialist Movement (USM) shortly after its inception in 1934, eventually becoming secretary. He was closely involved in the group's agitational work in support of anarchism in Spain before becoming – along with Jenny Patrick and Ethel MacDonald – a full-time "family" member of Aldred's Strickland Press when it was set up in 1939.

Like Aldred, Caldwell was a conscientious objector and resisted conscription during World War II. For many years, Caldwell shared with Ethel MacDonald a third-floor flat in Gibson Street, Hillhead, Glasgow. He acted as election agent for Aldred on four occasions.

Last of the quartet
Following Guy Aldred's death in 1963, Caldwell continued the work of both the USM and Strickland Press before finally closing the doors of their radical bookshop (somewhat coincidentally) in May 1968.

As Aldred's literary executor, he collated a microfilm archive of Aldred's journals and pamphlets as well as his unfinished autobiography, No Traitor's Gait and the manuscript of Caldwell's own, unfinished, three-volume biography, The Red Evangel. The latter was subsequently published, in an abridged form, as Come Dungeons Dark: The Life and Times of Guy Aldred, Glasgow Anarchist.

In 1966, to celebrate what would have been Aldred's 80th year, Caldwell produced a small collection of quotations, In Memoriam: Quotations from the writings of Guy A. Aldred

References

Media
Part One of a discussion with J. T. Caldwell on the history of anarchism in Glasgow (Audio available as Ogg, MP3, Streaming MP3 or WMA >22MB)
Part Two of a discussion with J. T. Caldwell on the history of anarchism in Glasgow (Audio available as Ogg, MP3, Streaming MP3 or WMA >22MB)
Photograph (ref 560.77.305) from the Burrell Collection Photo Library shows members of the USM in 1938(?) with John Taylor Caldwell (extreme right) and Guy Aldred (6th from right).

Bibliography
Caldwell, J.T. [ed. and introduction, uncredited] (1966), In Memoriam Guy A. Aldred, 1886 ― 1963: Quotations from the writings of Guy A. Aldred, Strickland Press, Glasgow
Caldwell, John T. (1978), "Guy Aldred, Anti-Parliamentarian, 1886-1963: A Memoir", Essays in Scottish Labour History: a tribute to W. H. Marwick, ed. MacDougall, I.,

External links
Anarchism in Glasgow, Part I and Anarchism in Glasgow, Part II - A discussion featuring Charlie Baird Snr, Mollie Baird, John Taylor Caldwell, Babs Raeside, 14 August 1987. Retrieved 2007-09-01
The Battle for the Green was Caldwell's contribution to a Clydeside Press anthology celebrating Glasgow's working-class history. It is also only slightly edited from the chapter of the same name in Come Dungeons Dark. Retrieved 2007-08-31.
Letter responding to review of Come Dungeons Dark from  Revolutionary History Vol.2, No.4, Spring 1990. (Original review appeared in Vol. 2, No. 1). Retrieved 2007-08-31
Obituary by Bob Jones and Gina Bridgeland from Bulletin of the Kate Sharpley Library. Retrieved 2007-08-31.
An appreciation of Caldwell by Ian Hamilton QC. Retrieved 2009-02-26.

1911 births
2007 deaths
Scottish anarchists
Scottish biographers
Scottish communists
Scottish conscientious objectors
Politicians from Glasgow
20th-century biographers